Blue Eyed Butcher is a 2012 American crime drama television film directed by Stephen Kay. It stars Sara Paxton, Justin Bruening and Lisa Edelstein. The film is based on the 2003 stabbing death of Jeff Wright by the hands of his wife, Susan Wright, but focuses on Kelly Siegler, the case's prosecutor. The film made its debut on March 3, 2012, on Lifetime. It later aired in France on the TF1 channel under the title 193 coups de folie.

Cast
 Sara Paxton as Susan Wright
 Justin Bruening as Jeff Wright
 Lisa Edelstein as Kelly Siegler
 Michael Gross as Ron Wright
 W. Earl Brown as Thomas Dean
 Vyto Ruginis as Philip Gross
 McKinley Freeman as Constable

References

External links
 

2012 television films
2012 films
American crime drama films
Crime films based on actual events
Films set in Houston
Lifetime (TV network) films
American drama television films
2012 crime drama films
2010s English-language films
Films directed by Stephen Kay
2010s American films